Matija Krivokapić (Cyrillic: Матија Кривокапић; born 19 March 2003) is a Montenegrin footballer who currently plays  as a striker for Fortuna Liga club MFK Zemplín Michalovce, on loan from FC DAC 1904 Dunajská Streda.

Club career
Born in Nikišić. He started his career in hometown clubs, Junior Nikšić and then moved to FK Sutjeska.

FK Podgorica
He joined FK Podgorica in 2018. At the age of 17, he started playing for the first team of FK Podgorica. During one and half year for FK Podgorica, he netted 10 league goals in 42 appearances.

DAC Dunajská Streda
Krivokapić became DAC Dunajská Streda player on 8 February 2023, signing contract until June 2026.

Loan at MFK Zemplín Michalovce
Currently, he is loaned at Zemplín Michalovce until June 2023.

References

External links

 
 Futbalnet profile 

2003 births
Living people
Sportspeople from Nikšić
Association football forwards
Montenegrin footballers
Montenegro youth international footballers
Montenegro under-21 international footballers
FK Sutjeska Nikšić players
FK Podgorica players
FC DAC 1904 Dunajská Streda players
MFK Zemplín Michalovce players
Montenegrin First League players
Slovak Super Liga players
Expatriate footballers in Slovakia
Montenegrin expatriate sportspeople in Slovakia